La Salle County is a county in Texas. As of the 2020 census, its population was 6,664. Its county seat is Cotulla. The county was created in 1858 and later organized in 1880. It is named for René-Robert Cavelier, Sieur de La Salle, a 17th-century French explorer.

History

Early history
The area of present-day La Salle County was occupied by the Coahuiltecan Indians until the 18th century, when they were squeezed out by the Spanish from the south and the Apache from the north. After the Mexican War of Independence, the Mexican government used land grants to encourage settlement, but very few settled in the area. By 1836, the area was entirely populated by Indians.

Between the Texas Revolution and the Mexican War, the area of present-day La Salle County lay in the disputed area between the Rio Grande and the Nueces River.  Desperadoes ruled the area, as neither the Mexican government nor the Republic of Texas could gain control.  The Treaty of Guadalupe Hidalgo assigned the Nueces Strip to Texas in 1848,  but outlaws and hostile Indians delayed settlement of the area.

La Salle County was officially formed in 1858 from the Bexar District.  The first settlements were established on the road from Laredo to San Antonio. In 1852, the Army established Fort Ewell near present-day Artesia Wells, where the road crossed the Nueces River, to protect travelers on the road.  The fort was abandoned in 1854, and the remaining inhabitants moved to the settlement of Guajoco, located one and a half miles from the fort.  By 1871, around 60 people lived in Guajoco, mostly of Mexican descent.

In 1856, William A. Waugh of Ohio established a ranch where the San Antonio–Laredo road crossed Cibolo Creek.  His ranch headquarters became a stopping point for travelers, and in 1879, a post office was established there with the name Waugh's Rancho.  Iuka, an early settlement located 8 miles west of present-day Cotulla, was established in 1868 by several families and served as a stage stop and marketplace for cattle buyers.  The settlement established a post office in 1880.  In 1870, the population of La Salle County was 69, and by 1880, it was 789.

La Salle County was formally organized in 1880 and Stuart's Rancho, near Guajoco, was designated the county seat.  In the early 1880s, the International-Great Northern Railroad laid tracks to the county.  Around this time, outlaws were gradually eliminated from the area, and the last Indian raid happened in 1878.  These changes help bring stability to the county.

With the arrival of the railroads, settlements such as Iuka and Guajoco were abandoned as inhabitants moved near the railroad tracks.  Polish immigrant Joseph Cotulla arrived in La Salle County in 1868 and eventually established a large ranching operation.  In 1881, Cotulla donated 120 acres of his land to the railroad for the townsite of Cotulla, and the railroad built a depot there in 1882.  While Cotulla continued to develop his town, Iuka's postmaster, Jesse Laxton, developed a townsite just across the tracks named La Salle.  La Salle was granted a post office in 1881, and in 1882, was designated the temporary county seat.  However, Cotulla became the county seat by special election in 1883.

Geography

Major highways

Adjacent counties
 Frio County (north)
 Atascosa County (northeast)
 McMullen County (east)
 Webb County (south)
 Dimmit County (west)
 Zavala County (northwest)

Demographics

As of the 2020 United States census, there were 6,664 people, 2,142 households, and 1,659 families residing in the county.

As of the census of 2000, 5,866 people, 1,819 households, and 1,351 were families residing in the county.  The population density was 4 people per mi2 (2/km2).  The 2,436 housing units averaged 2 per mi2 (1/km2).  The racial makeup of the county was 81.47% White, 3.55% African American, 0.34% Native American, 0.31% Asian, 12.21% from other races, and 2.13% from two or more races.  About 77.12% of the population were Hispanic or Latino of any race.

Of the 1,819 households, 37.7% had children under the age of 18 living with them, 54.7% were married couples living together, 15.4% had a female householder with no husband present, and 25.7% were not families. About 22.9% of all households were made up of individuals, and 12.0% had someone living alone who was 65 years of age or older.  The average household size was 2.89, and the average family size was 3.45.

In the county, the age distribution was 29.4% under  18, 10.0% from 18 to 24, 27.7% from 25 to 44, 21.3% from 45 to 64, and 11.6% who were 65 or older.  The median age was 33 years. For every 100 females, there were 113.50 males.  For every 100 females age 18 and over, there were 121.40 males.

Males had a median income of $20,856 versus $17,339 for females. The per capita income for the county was $9,692. About 28.20% of families and 29.80% of the population were below the poverty line, including 38.50% of those under age 18 and 24.80% of those age 65 or over. The county's per capita income makes it one of the poorest counties in the United States, yet the average income of the top 1% highest earners in the county was $6,021,357, one of the highest in the United States.

Education
Most of La Salle County is served by the Cotulla Independent School District. The Dilley Independent School District serves a small portion of northwestern La Salle County.

The designated community college is Southwest Texas Junior College.

Communities

Cities
 Cotulla (county seat)
 Encinal

Census-designated place
 Fowlerton

Unincorporated communities
 Artesia Wells
 Los Angeles
 Millett

Ghost town
 Dull

Notable people
O. Henry, the famous short-story writer, lived and worked on a sheep ranch in La Salle County from 1882 to 1884 before settling in Austin as a pharmacist and bank teller.

Ray Keck, the fifth and current president of Texas A&M International University in Laredo, was born in San Antonio and reared in Cotulla, where his father, Ray Keck, Jr., was president of Stockmen's National Bank.

Politics
La Salle County is a solid Democratic stronghold like most of South Texas. Since 1904, the county 
voted for the Republican twice, first in the 1972 Nixon landslide and again in 2020 when Donald Trump flipped the county, claiming 55% of the vote.

See also

 National Register of Historic Places in La Salle County, Texas
 Recorded Texas Historic Landmarks in La Salle County
 Winter Garden Region

References

External links

 
 "La Salle County Profile" from the Texas Association of Counties

 
1880 establishments in Texas
Populated places established in 1880
Majority-minority counties in Texas
Hispanic and Latino American culture in Texas